Hardu-Aboora is a locality in Karhama tehsil in Baramulla district in the Indian union territory of Jammu and Kashmir. Under new Administrative units, Hardu Aboora was granted CD Block status, under the jurisdiction of newly carved tehsil, Karhama.

Features
Shrines of Sufi saints Syed Ahmad Rumi, Shah Fatahullah Qadiri, Saboor Khan and Rahim are located in the area. A branch of J&K Bank, BDO Office, a government high school and a private middle school namely SARoomi' besides a branch Post Office. Hardu-Aboora is the center for many villages such as Kharpora and Tarahama. Hardu-Aboora has a Primary Health Center either.

Demographics
The literacy rate is increasing with time, it was 50% in 2008 which later increased to 73%. People in this village are mostly dependent on the business. Hardu Aboora is famous for its handicrafts and kulchas (salty biscuit).

Transportation

Hardu-Aboora is well connected to the rest of valley, bus services run from various renowned places such as summer capital, Srinagar, Baramulla and Tangmarg. Under the National Rural Employment Guarantee Act, 2005 the village has been modified but still, some pulls are under construction which on completion will change the whole context of the village. Nearby places include Dhobiwan, Kunzer and Magam.

References

Villages in Baramulla district